Juan Cano may refer to:

 Juan Cano de Saavedra (c. 1502–1572), Spanish conquistador
 Juan Cano (soccer) (born 1956), retired Colombian-American soccer forward 
 Juan Manuel Cano (born 1987), Argentine racewalker